The Richardson River, an inland intermittent river of the Wimmera catchment, located in the Grampians and Wimmera regions of the Australian state of Victoria. Rising on the northern slopes of the Great Dividing Range, the Richardson River flows generally north and drains into Lake Buloke, one of a series of ephemeral lakes that, whilst they do not directly empty into a defined watercourse, form part of the Murray River catchment of the Murray-Darling basin.

Location and features
The Richardson River rises on the northern slopes of the Great Dividing Range in the Mori Mori Nature Conservation Reserve. The Richardson River descends  over its  course.

Etymology
In the Aboriginal Djadjawurrung and Jardwadjali languages, the river is named Larning, meaning "your camp"; Witjibar, meaning "basket grass river"; and Wallamyer with no defined meaning. In the Djadjawurrung, Jardwadjali, and Wergaia languages, the river is named Barnunung, meaning "smouldering away". In the Djadjawurrung language, the river is named Kurakibiyal with kurak meaning "sand"" and biyal meaning "red gum". In the Jardwadjali language, the river is named Willaring, with wille meaning a "common silver grey possum". And in an undefined Aboriginal language, the river is called Wirchilleba meaning "a dry watercourse".
Named after John Matthew Richardson who fell from his horse during Thomas Mitchell's 1836 expedition.

See also

 List of rivers of Victoria

References

External links

North-Central catchment
Rivers of Grampians (region)
Rivers of Loddon Mallee (region)
Wimmera
Grampians (national park)